Partula affinis is a species of air-breathing tropical land snail, a terrestrial pulmonate gastropod mollusk in the family Partulidae. This species is endemic to Tahiti, French Polynesia. It is now critically endangered.

References

External links
 
 Partula affinis at PartulaPages

Partula (gastropod)
Extinct gastropods
Taxa named by William Harper Pease
Taxonomy articles created by Polbot
Gastropods described in 1868